Natula is a genus of sword-tail crickets in the tribe Trigonidiini.

Species
Species have been recorded from Europe through to SE Asia and Australia; they include:
Natula anaxiphoides (Chopard, 1925)
Natula averni (Costa, 1855)
Natula longipennis (Serville, 1838)
Natula matsuurai Sugimoto, 2001
Natula pallidula (Matsumura, 1910)
Natula pravdini (Gorochov, 1985) - type species

References 

Trigonidiinae
Ensifera genera